Something Like Human is the second album by the band Fuel, released in 2000 on Epic Records. Something Like Human reached number 17 on the U.S. Billboard 200, and featured their first U.S. top 40 hit with "Hemorrhage (In My Hands)" which reached number 30 on the Billboard Hot 100 charts. It remains one of their most popular songs to date.

The album was certified double-platinum status by the RIAA on September 25, 2001. The album was also certified Gold (50,000 units) in Canada in June 2001. To date, Something Like Human is the band's best-selling record.

The bonus version of the disc includes an acoustic version of Hemorrhage, and also includes the cover songs "Daniel", originally by Elton John, and "Going to California" by Led Zeppelin.

Some editions had a bonus disc instead of just bonus tracks. The bonus disc had the three bonus songs plus "Walk the Sky", a bonus song from Sunburn. This disc also had multimedia content which included music videos for "Hemorrhage (In My Hands)" and "Innocent".

The album's title comes from a lyric of the song "Prove".

Critical reception

Ultimately giving the album a "B", Entertainment Weekly said the band "has more chops than a butcher shop. But when it comes to passion, Fuel runs low."  The magazine concluded that "luckily, Bret Scallions' excoriating voice makes up for Carl Bell's rather clinical-sounding music."

Track listing
All songs written by Carl Bell, except where noted.

Early promotional press editions of the album (submitted to magazines, etc. for reviews) included the songs "Sister Mary Innocent" and the Scallions penned "Bruises", which ultimately were left off the final sequence of the album which was released to stores. Neither of these recordings have been released publicly by the band. "Sister Mary Innocent" appeared by alternate name "Sister Mary" on Tommy Lee's 2005 solo album Tommyland: The Ride, with Carl Bell on guitar.

Personnel
Brett Scallions - lead vocals, rhythm guitar
Carl Bell - lead guitar, backing vocals
Jeff Abercrombie - bass 
Kevin Miller - drums

Additional personnel

Luis Resto - Keyboards
Carol Steele - Percussion
David Campbell - String arrangement on "Hemorrhage (In My Hands)"

Production
Ben Grosse: Producer & Mixing
Tom Baker: Mastering

Charts and certifications

Weekly charts

Year-end charts

Certifications

References

Fuel (band) albums
2000 albums
Epic Records albums